The 2015 USA Rugby League season was the fifth season of the USA Rugby League National Premiership competition, and its first as the undisputed top-level rugby league competition in the United States. Fourteen teams competed for the USARL Championship.  The season began on Saturday, May 30, and concluded with the Championship Final on Saturday, August 29, in Jacksonville, Florida.  The Boston Thirteens won their first USARL Championship, defeating the Atlanta Rhinos 44-12.

Teams
In the wake of the folding of the AMNRL, the USARL was left as the undisputed top-level rugby league competition in the United States.  Three teams joined the USARL from the AMNRL: Bucks County Sharks, Connecticut Wildcats, and New York Knights.  The Delaware Black Foxes joined as an expansion squad.  After several unsuccessful seasons, the Baltimore Blues left the competition.

Regular season
Teams in the South Conference played 6 games on a double round-robin schedule.  Teams in the North Conference played 8 games, primarily within their own division.  A win was worth 2 points, a draw worth 1 point, and a loss worth 0 points.  There were no bonus points for number of tries or close losses.

Final regular-season standings.

Playoffs
For 2015, the USARL further extended the division and conference playoff structure introduced in 2014.  In the South Conference, the teams with the best and worst records, and the second- and third-best records, played each other in the South Conference Semi-Finals.  The winners met in the South Conference Final.  In the North Conference, the teams with the second- and third-best records in each division played each other in the North Conference Division Semi-Finals.  The winners played the teams with the best records in their respective divisions in the North Conference Divisional Finals.  The winners of the Divisional Finals played in the North Conference Final.  The winners of the Conference Finals met in the Championship Final.

References

USARL season
USA Rugby League
Seasons in American rugby league
2015 in American sports